Saepiseuthes is a genus of longhorn beetles of the subfamily Lamiinae, containing the following species:

 Saepiseuthes chilensis Thomson, 1868
 Saepiseuthes obliquatus (Fairmaire & Germain, 1859)

References

Forsteriini